The growth curve model in statistics is a specific multivariate linear model, also known as GMANOVA (Generalized Multivariate Analysis-Of-Variance). It generalizes MANOVA by allowing post-matrices, as seen in the definition.

Definition
Growth curve model: Let X be a p×n random matrix  corresponding to the observations, A a p×q within design matrix with q ≤ p, B a q×k parameter matrix, C a k×n between individual design matrix with rank(C) + p ≤ n and let Σ be a positive-definite p×p matrix. Then

 

defines the growth curve model, where A and C are known, B and Σ are unknown, and E is a random matrix distributed as Np,n(0,Ip,n).

This differs from standard MANOVA by the addition of C, a "postmatrix".

History
Many writers have considered the growth curve analysis, among them Wishart (1938), Box (1950)  and Rao (1958).  Potthoff and Roy in 1964; were the first in analyzing longitudinal data applying  GMANOVA models.

Applications
GMANOVA is frequently used for the analysis of surveys, clinical trials, and agricultural data, as well as more recently in the context of Radar adaptive detection.

Other uses
In mathematical statistics, growth curves such as those used in biology are often modeled as being continuous stochastic processes, e.g. as being sample paths that almost surely solve  stochastic differential equations.  Growth curves have been also applied in forecasting market development. When variables are measured with error, a Latent growth modeling SEM can be used.

Footnotes

References
 

Analysis of variance
Statistical forecasting
Multivariate time series
Ordinary differential equations
Exponentials
Biostatistics
Growth curves